Pwani Region (Mkoa wa Pwani in Swahili) is one of Tanzania's 31 administrative regions. The word "Pwani" in Swahili means the "coast". The regional capital is the town of Kibaha. The Region borders the Tanga Region to the north, Morogoro Region to the west, Lindi Region to the south, and surrounds Dar es Salaam Region to the east. The Indian Ocean also borders the region to its northeast and southeast. The region is home to Mafia Island, the Rufiji delta and Saadani National Park. The region is home to Bagamoyo town, a historical Swahili settlement, and the first colonial capital of German East Africa.  According to the 2012 national census, the region had a population of 1,098,668, which was slightly lower than the pre-census projection of 1,110,917. From 2002 to 2012, the region's 2.2 percent average annual population growth rate was the seventeenth-highest in the country. It was also the 21st most densely populated region with 34 people per square kilometre., the region is slightly larger than Belgium.

Population
The native peoples of the Pwani Region are the Zaramo, Kwere, Doe, Ndengereko, Zigua, and Rufiji. The Zaramo are the dominant people group in Pwani Region and are native to central Pwani, specifically in Kisarawe, Kibaha, Mkuranga, and Bagamoyo districts. The second-largest group in terms of the territory is the Rufiji people who are native to Rufiji and Kibiti districts. The Kwere and Doe are native to Bagamoyo District and also southern Zigua people. In 2012, the region had 1,098,668 residents, up from 885,017 in the 2002 Population Census, indicating a considerable increase of 213,651 individuals (24.1%) during the intercensal period. The region has a population of 2.5 percent of Tanzania's overall population. When compared to other regions on the Mainland, the Coast Region ranks fifth least populated, followed by Iringa, Lindi, Njombe, and Katavi. Between 1988 and 2002, the population of the Pwani Region increased at a rate of 2.4 percent each year. Between 2002 and 2012, the annual growth rate fell to an average of 2.2 percent.

Economy
Agriculture remains the mainstay of the Pwani Region's economy. Commercial and peasant farming are practiced, with the latter taking precedence. Crop farming employed 82 percent of the economically active population in the 2007/08 Coast area agriculture sample census report, followed by livestock husbandry (2 percent), and fishing (2%). The remaining 12% worked in non-farming activities such as trade and repairs. Agriculture generates the majority of the region's monetary income, primarily through the sale of coconuts, oranges, mango, and cassava on a large scale.

Administrative divisions

Districts
As of 2012, Pwani Region is divided into six districts, each administered by a council:

However, additional districts have been added since 2012; Kibiti District and Chalinze District.

Education
Secondary (high) schools operated by the ministry of education in Pwani Region include:

 Kibaha Secondary School (Kibaha District)
 Kibiti Secondary School (Rufiji District)
 Minaki Secondary School (Kisarawe District) — this school was established in Kisarawe in 1925, as St. Andrews College.  Prior to that, it traces its history back to a Universities' Mission to Central Africa mission school established in Kiungani, Zanzibar, in 1869.

Notable people
 Jakaya Kikwete, 4th President of Tanzania

References

External links
 

 
Regions of Tanzania